Progress M-15 was a Russian uncrewed cargo spacecraft which was launched in 1992 to resupply the Mir space station. The thirty-third of sixty-four Progress spacecraft to visit Mir, it used the Progress-M 11F615A55 configuration, and had the serial number 215. It carried supplies including food, water and oxygen for the EO-12 crew aboard Mir, as well as equipment for conducting scientific research, and fuel for adjusting the station's orbit and performing manoeuvres. It also transported the Mak 2 satellite, which was deployed from Mir on 20 November. TORU manual docking system was first tested in this mission.

Progress M-15 was launched at 17:19:41 GMT on 27 October 1992, atop a Soyuz-U2 carrier rocket flying from Site 31/6 at the Baikonur Cosmodrome. Following two days of free flight, it docked with the aft port of the Kvant-1 module at 17:19:41 GMT on 29 October.

Progress M-15 undocked from Mir at 00:44:53 GMT on 4 February 1993, however it remained in orbit to conduct the Znamya 2 experiment, and research into autonomous flight. It was deorbited on 7 February, and burned up during reentry over the Pacific Ocean at around 08:03:35 GMT.

See also

1992 in spaceflight
1993 in spaceflight
List of Progress flights
List of uncrewed spaceflights to Mir

References

Spacecraft launched in 1992
1993 in spaceflight
Progress (spacecraft) missions